The Eo is a river,  long, in northwestern Spain. Its estuary forms the boundary between the regions of Galicia and Asturias. The river is known for its salmon fishing.

In the western Cantabrian mountains the river forms the axis of one of Asturias 7 biosphere reserves, the Eo river, Oscos and Terras de Burón Biosphere Reserve.

See also 
 List of rivers of Spain
 Rivers of Galicia

References

External links
 Río Eo

Rivers of Spain
Rivers of Galicia (Spain)
Rivers of Asturias
Ramsar sites in Spain